Guillaume Besse may refer to:

Guillaume Besse (historian) ( 17th century), French historian
Guillaume Besse (entrepreneur) (born 1971), French entrepreneur
Guillaume Besse (ice hockey) (born 1976), 2001/2002 winner of the Charles Ramsay Trophy